C13 or C-13 may refer to:
 French Defence, Encyclopaedia of Chess Openings code
 C13 White Lead (Painting) Convention, 1921
 C13 grenade, the Canadian Forces designation for a M67 grenade
 Autovia C-13, a highway in Catalonia in Spain
 Caterpillar C13 Engine, an engine by Caterpillar Inc.
 , a 1906 British C-class submarine
 IEC 60320 C13, a polarised, three pole plug used in electric power cables
 LNER Class C13, a 4-4-2T steam locomotive class of 1907, built for suburban passenger services around London
 OTO Melara C13
 Sauber C13, a 1994 racing car
 Caldwell 13 (NGC 457, the Owl Cluster or ET Cluster), an open star cluster in the constellation Cassiopeia
 The 13th century
 in music, a chord with the structure 1 - 3 - 5 - b7 - 9 - 13
 Carbon-13, a natural stable isotope of carbon
 Malignant neoplasm of hypopharynx ICD-10 code
 C13/C14 Coupler, a class of cable connector used by most desktop computers